Lima Township School, also known as Lima School, was a historic school building located at Howe, Lima Township, LaGrange County, Indiana.  It was built in 1874–1875, and was a -story, Gothic Revival style brick building on a raised basement.  It had a hipped roof with gable dormers.  Additions were made in 1911, 1927, and 1961. It has been demolished.

It was listed in the National Register of Historic Places in 1985 and delisted in 1986.

References

Former National Register of Historic Places in Indiana
School buildings on the National Register of Historic Places in Indiana
Gothic Revival architecture in Indiana
School buildings completed in 1875
Buildings and structures in LaGrange County, Indiana
National Register of Historic Places in LaGrange County, Indiana